Russell K. Haight Jr. was an American G.I. who had served as a U.S. Army Air Force sergeant during World War II. After the war, he became "famous" by serving as a mercenary commander of the rebel forces of Azad Kashmir for a few months in 1947. His testimony about Pakistan's involvement in the hostilities was cited in the United Nations debates on the Kashmir dispute.

Army career
By his own account, Haight served in three armies during the World War II. He first served with the Canadians, then switched to the British and participated in the commando raid on Dieppe. Finally, he joined the American Army after the US joined the war.

After the war, Haight went to Afghanistan and worked as a surveyor for the American construction company Morrison–Knudsen, which was engaged in building roads there. After having a fall from a cliff, he left the job, and was intending to head back to the US with various stops in Pakistan and India along the way.

Kashmir War 

In Rawalpindi, then the hotbed of the First Kashmir War raging in 1947, Haight ran into the British correspondent Bill Sydney Smith of the Daily Express, who suggested to him that he could utilise his expertise in commanding the Pakistani tribal raiders engaged in the Kashmir War. Haight was sold on the idea.

He signed up with the Azad Kashmir provisional government, then based in Rawalpindi. He was given a commission as a captain and sent to the Poonch front. After he criticised the Azad Kashmir commanders there for their "boy scout tactics", the government apparently promoted him to the rank of a "brigadier general". He later claimed to have commanded 8,000 troops. According to a New York Times report by Robert Trumbull, Haight was able to successfully discharge his command by playing on the vanity of the tribesmen and exploiting their tribal rivalries.
By the end of 1947, Haight's engagement with the Kashmir War was over. While he claimed to have quit because of inadequate resources, scuffles with some of the fighters from Dir had played a role. The fighters are said to have attempted to steal Haight's truck and some captured guns, and he ended up killing a couple of them in the ensuing firefight. Trumbull states that, he was effectively a fugitive by the time he left Pakistan. He took a flight to the US with only $2.00 in his pocket.

According to a Soviet writer, I. Andronov, Haight was "actively assisted by several resident agents of the British Intelligence Service and top-flight British representatives in India and Pakistan".
According to journalist G. K. Reddy, then a PR official in the Azad Kashmir government, Russell K. Haight was "a senior officer of the US Office of Strategic Services (OSS)". He is said to have operated in Azad Kashmir under the code name 'General Tariq'.

Haight estimated that there were 15,000 tribal fighters in Kashmir, and a similar number on the move ("coming and going on dispersed along the border"). There were also said to be a fair number of Pakistani officers on leave involved in the war. Robert Trumbull narrated:

Later career 
After returning from South Asia, Haight went back to the US Army. He served in 
Korea, Germany, Bolivia and Vietnam, and retired from U.S. army in 1967 as a sergeant-major. He had seven rows of decorations and ribbons and numerous injuries from the various theatres in which he fought.

See also 
 Kashmir Conflict

Notes

References

Bibliography 
 
 

Year of birth missing (living people)
Living people
United States Army Air Forces personnel of World War II
Azad Kashmir
People of the Indo-Pakistani War of 1947